Super Jodi is a 2023 Indian Tamil-language reality television show on Zee Tamil. It premiered on 5 February 2023 every Sunday at 18:30 and is also available on Zee5.

The show is perceived to challenge the real emotional bond and human connections of 10 real-life Tamil celebrity couples. Sangeetha and Baba Bhaskar as the judges and RJ Vijay and Kiki Vijay as the hosts.

Format
This show features 10 real life celebrity couple of the Tamil television industry.

Contestants

References 

Zee Tamil original programming
2023 Tamil-language television series debuts
Tamil-language television shows
Tamil-language game shows
Tamil-language reality television series
Television shows set in Tamil Nadu